The Orauea River is a river in New Zealand, a tributary of the Waiau River in Southland.

See also
List of rivers of New Zealand

References

Rivers of Southland, New Zealand
Rivers of New Zealand